Charles G. Rosher, A.S.C. (17 November 1885 – 15 January 1974) was an English-born cinematographer who worked from the early days of silent films through the 1950s.

He was Mary Pickford's favourite cinematographer and a personal friend, shooting all of the films in which she starred from 1918 to 1927, before they had a falling out during production of Coquette (1929). He was the first cinematographer to receive an Academy Award, along with Karl Struss, for Sunrise: A Song of Two Humans (1927), and won again for The Yearling (1946), with Leonard Smith and Arthur Arling. He was also nominated four times.

Biography 

Charles Rosher was born in London in 1885.

According to an interview of him in the documentary The Image Makers: The Adventures of America's Pioneer Cinematographers, he was originally unhappily studying naval architecture, but enrolled in London Polytechnic's school of photography, photography being a hobby of his. He eventually became an assistant to Richard Speaight, the official photographer of the British royal family.

After attending a conference in Rochester, New York, in 1908, he decided to stay in the United States, as the pay was much better and he did not have to wear a morning coat. He became a newsreel cameraman. In 1910, he went to work for David Horsley in his production company in New Jersey. Because early film was largely restricted to using daylight, Horsley relocated his production company to Hollywood in 1911, taking Rosher with him, and opened the first movie studio there. This made Rosher the first full-time cameraman in Hollywood.

In 1913, Rosher went to Mexico to shoot newsreel footage of Pancho Villa's rebellion.

In January 1919, he was one of the 15 founders of the American Society of Cinematographers and served as the group's first vice-president. In the 1920s, he was one of the more sought-after cinematographers in Hollywood, and was a personal favourite of stars such as Mary Pickford, working with her, first on A Little Princess (1917), then on all the films she acted in from How Could You, Jean? (1918) to My Best Girl (1927). However, they had a falling out over the restrictions the sound department wanted to impose in shooting Coquette (1929), Pickford's first talking picture, and Karl Struss took over the cinematography. His work with Struss on F. W. Murnau's 1927 film Sunrise: A Song of Two Humans is viewed as a milestone in cinematography and won the pair the first Academy Award for cinematography in 1929. He shot five films for producer David O. Selznick, including Rockabye (1932), Our Betters (1933) and Little Lord Fauntleroy (1936).

Rosher worked at several studios, but spent the last 12 years of his career exclusively at Metro-Goldwyn-Mayer, shooting such films as Annie Get Your Gun, Show Boat, Kiss Me Kate, and The Yearling.

He was rumoured to have been Anna May Wong's lover when she was 20.

Rosher is the father of actress Joan Marsh and cinematographer Charles Rosher Jr. (1935–2015), who filmed 3 Women (1977) and A Wedding (1978) for Robert Altman, as well as Semi-Tough (1977), The Onion Field (1979) and Independence Day (1983).

Rosher died of an accidental fall in Lisbon, Portugal, on 15 January 1974. He was 88.

Awards 
 1929 – Oscar for Best Cinematography, with Karl Struss, for Sunrise: A Song of Two Humans
 1935 – Best Cinematography Oscar nomination for The Affairs of Cellini
 1945 – Oscar nomination for Kismet
 1947 – Best Cinematography Oscar, with Leonard Smith and Arthur E. Arling, for The Yearling
 1951 – Oscar nomination for Annie Get Your Gun
 1952 – Oscar nomination for Show Boat
 1955 and 1957 – George Eastman Award, given by George Eastman House for distinguished contribution to the art of film

In addition, Rosher received Photoplay magazine's Gold Medal, and the only fellowship awarded by the Society of Motion Picture Engineers.

Filmography 
* indicates a Pickford film.

 The Indian Raiders (1912 short)
 Early Days in the West (1912 short)
 Life of Villa (1912 documentary)
 With Pancho Villa in Mexico (1913)
 The Next in Command (1914)
 The Oath of a Viking (1914 short)
 The Mystery of the Poison Pool (1914)
 Santo Icario (1914)
 The Smuggler's Lass (1915 short)
 The Mad Maid of the Forest (1915 short)
 Gene of the Northland (1915 short)
 The Voice in the Fog (1915)
 Blackbirds (1915)
 The Blacklist (1916)
 The Sowers (1916)
 The Clown (1916)
 Common Ground (1916)
 Anton the Terrible (1916)
 The Heir to the Hoorah (1916)
 The Plow Girl (1916)
 On Record (1917)
 A Mormon Maid (1917)
 The Primrose Ring (1917)
 At First Sight (1917)
 Hashimura Togo (1917)
 A Little Princess* (1917), with Walter Stradling
 The Secret Game (1917)
 The Widow's Might (1918)
 One More American (1918)
 The Honor of His House (1918)
 The White Man's Law (1918)
 How Could You, Jean?* (1918)
 Johanna Enlists* (1918)
 Too Many Millions (1918)
 The Dub (1919)
 Captain Kidd, Jr.* (1919)
 Daddy-Long-Legs* (1919)
 The Hoodlum* (1919)
 Heart o' the Hills* (1919)
 Pollyanna* (1920)
 Suds* (1920), with L. William O'Connell
 The White Circle (1920), with Alfred Ortlieb
 Dinty (1920), with David Kesson and Foster Leonard
 The Love Light* (1921)
 Through the Back Door* (1921)
 Little Lord Fauntleroy* (1921)
 Smilin' Through (1922), with J. Roy Hunt
 Tess of the Storm Country* (1922)
 Sant'Ilario (1923)
 Rosita* (1923)
 Tiger Rose (1923)
 Dorothy Vernon of Haddon Hall* (1924)
 Three Women (1924), with Charles Van Enger
 Little Annie Rooney* (1925), with Hal Mohr
 Sparrows* (1926), with Hal Mohr
 Sunrise: A Song of Two Humans (1927)
 My Best Girl* (1927)
 Tempest (1928)
 Coquette* (1929) (uncredited)
 Eternal Love (1929), with Oliver T. Marsh
 The Vagabond Queen (1929)
 Atlantik (1929)
 Atlantic (1929)
 The Road Is Fine (1930)
 Knowing Men (1930)
 Two Worlds (1930)
 Zwei Welten (1930), with Mutz Greenbaum
 The Price of Things (1930)
 Atlantis (1930)
 War Nurse (1930)
 Paid (1930)
 Les deux mondes (1930)
 Dance, Fools, Dance (1931)
 Laughing Sinners (1931)
 This Modern Age (1931)
 Silence (1931)
 The Beloved Bachelor (1931)
 Husband's Holiday (1931)
 What Price Hollywood? (1932)
 Two Against the World (1932)
 Flaming Gold (1932)
 Rockabye (1932)
 The Past of Mary Holmes (1933)
 Our Betters (1933)
 The Silver Cord (1933)
 Bed of Roses (1933)
 After Tonight (1933)
 Moulin Rouge (1934)
 The Affairs of Cellini (1934)
 Outcast Lady (1934)
 What Every Woman Knows (1934)
 After Office Hours (1935)
 Call of the Wild (1935)
 Broadway Melody of 1936 (1935)
 Little Lord Fauntleroy (1936)
 Small Town Girl (1936), with Oliver T. Marsh
 Men Are Not Gods (1936)
 The Woman I Love (1937)
 The Perfect Specimen (1937)
 Hollywood Hotel (1937), with George Barnes
 White Banners (1938)
 Hard to Get (1938)
 Off the Record (1939)
 Yes, My Darling Daughter (1939)
 Hell's Kitchen (1939)
 Espionage Agent (1939)
 A Child Is Born (1939)
 Brother Rat and a Baby (1940)
 Three Cheers for the Irish (1940)
 My Love Came Back (1940)
 Four Mothers (1941)
 Million Dollar Baby (1941)
 One Foot in Heaven (1941)
 Mokey (1942)
 Pierre of the Plains (1942)
 Stand By for Action (1942)
 Assignment in Brittany (1943)
 I Dood It (1943) (uncredited)
 Swing Fever (1943)
 Kismet (1944)
 Ziegfeld Follies (1945), with George Folsey and Ray June (uncredited)
 Yolanda and the Thief (1945)
 The Yearling (1946), with Arthur Arling and Leonard Smith
 Fiesta (1947), with Wilfrid M. Cline and Sidney Wagner
 Dark Delusion (1947)
 Song of the Thin Man (1947)
 On an Island with You (1948)
 Words and Music (1948), with Harry Stradling
 Neptune's Daughter (1949)
 The Red Danube (1949)
 East Side, West Side (1949)
 Annie Get Your Gun (1950)
 Pagan Love Song (1950)
 Show Boat (1951)
 Scaramouche (1952)
 The Story of Three Loves (1953)
 Young Bess (1953), with Harold Rosson
 Kiss Me Kate (1953)
 Jupiter's Darling (1955), with Paul C. Vogel

References

External links 

 
 Biography in the New York Times

1885 births
1974 deaths
British cinematographers
Best Cinematographer Academy Award winners
Film people from London
British expatriates in the United States